Caillou is a children's television series. It may also refer to:

 Caillou (book series), the series of books on which the television series is based
 Caillou (EP), an extended-play record by Andrew Wade

See also
 Cailloux